The 1976–77 season was the 78th completed season of The Football League.  

As of this season, goal difference (GD in league tables) was used to separate the clubs finishing level on points. The earlier system, used from the season 1894–95 until the 1975–76 had been the so-called goal average (goals scored divided by goals conceded), or more properly put, goal ratio. In case one or more teams had the same positive goal difference, this earlier system favoured those teams who had scored fewer goals. Now the system would favour the teams that had scored more goals, and it was hoped that more goals would be seen as a result of this new system.

The season was also the first in which the referee used the yellow card and the red card, with the yellow to caution the offending player, and the red to show spectators and viewers that the player had been ejected from the game.  Writing in The Observer, sportswriter Bob Houston noted that the season opener was "the day the Football League went Continental, arming its referees with those coloured cards we've all learned to watch for in European and World Cup matches."

On 2 October 1976, Dave Wagstaffe of Blackburn Rovers became the first player in Football League history to be shown the red card when he was sent off in a 1-0 win over Orient in a Division 2 match.

Overview
Liverpool retained their league championship trophy and won their first European Cup to confirm Bob Paisley as a successful replacement for Bill Shankly in his third season at the helm. Tottenham Hotspur and Stoke City's long spells in the First Division came to an end with relegation. Stoke sacked their manager Tony Waddington. On the last day of the season, Coventry City and Bristol City played out a controversial 2–2 draw, with play virtually stopping when it was heard that Sunderland had lost to Everton.  Both clubs survived while Sunderland was relegated.

After Manchester United manager Tommy Docherty had admitted his affair with the wife of the club's physiotherapist, the club's directors decided that he had broken their moral code and he was sacked.

Wolverhampton Wanderers, Chelsea and Nottingham Forest gained promotion to the First Division. Brian Clough's Forest would achieve success beyond the dreams of most supporters over the next few seasons. Carlisle United, Plymouth Argyle and Hereford United occupied the three relegation places. Hereford became the first club to finish bottom of the Second Division after winning the Third Division the previous season.

Mansfield Town, Brighton & Hove Albion and Crystal Palace were the three teams promoted to the Second Division. Palace's manager was a certain Terry Venables who would enjoy more success at Palace and elsewhere over the next 20 years. Going down were Reading, Northampton Town, Grimsby Town and York City.

Cambridge United, Exeter City, Colchester United and Bradford City occupied the four promotion places in the league's lowest division. A terrible season for Workington was compounded by their failure to gain re-election to the Football League, a humiliation which saw them slip into the Northern Premier League. In their place were Southern League champions Wimbledon, who would make amazing progress over the next decade.

The British pop star Elton John took over Fourth Division side Watford and installed Graham Taylor as manager. Former Arsenal manager Bertie Mee came out of retirement to work at Watford as assistant to Graham Taylor. John immediately asserted his ambition by promising to bring First Division football to Watford.

Final league tables and results

The tables and results below are reproduced here in the exact form that they can be found at The Rec.Sport.Soccer Statistics Foundation website and in Rothmans Book of Football League Records 1888–89 to 1978–79, with home and away statistics separated.

Beginning with the season 1894–95, clubs finishing level on points were separated according to goal average (goals scored divided by goals conceded), or more properly put, goal ratio. In case one or more teams had the same goal difference, this system favoured those teams who had scored fewer goals. The goal average system was eventually scrapped beginning with this season.

Re-election: During the first five seasons of the league, that is, until the season 1893–94, re-election process concerned the clubs which finished in the bottom four of the league. From the 1894–95 season and until the 1920–21 season the re-election process was required of the clubs which finished in the bottom three of the league. From the 1922–23 season on it was required of the bottom two teams of both Third Division North and Third Division South. Since the Fourth Division was established in the 1958–59 season, the re-election process has concerned the bottom four clubs in that division.

First Division

Despite failing to win any of their final four matches, Liverpool retained the First Division title against a strong challenge by Manchester City and went on to win the European Cup for the first time, although their bid for a unique treble was ended when they lost to Manchester United in the final of the FA Cup. Liverpool finished a point ahead of Manchester City in the league. Ipswich Town, Aston Villa and Newcastle United completed the top five. Newly promoted West Bromwich Albion finished seventh.

Tottenham Hotspur went down in bottom place after a 27-year run in the First Division, along with Stoke City who had been in the First Division continuously since 1963. The final relegation place went to Sunderland, just one year after promotion.

Results

Maps

Second Division

Wolverhampton Wanderers achieved an instant return to the First Division as champions of the Second Division, while runners-up Chelsea regained their top flight status two years after losing it. Brian Clough steered Nottingham Forest into the final promotion place, while Bolton Wanderers and Blackpool missed out by a single point.

Hereford United, Plymouth Argyle and Carlisle United went down to the Third Division.

Results

Maps

Third Division

Results

Maps

Fourth Division

Results

Maps

See also
 1976-77 in English football

References

Ian Laschke: Rothmans Book of Football League Records 1888–89 to 1978–79. Macdonald and Jane's, London & Sydney, 1980.

 
English Football League seasons
1